Väggarp is a locality situated in Eslöv Municipality, Skåne County, Sweden with 211 inhabitants in 2010.

References 

Populated places in Eslöv Municipality
Populated places in Skåne County